Club Deportivo Numancia de Soria, S.A.D. is a Spanish football club in Soria, in the autonomous community of Castile and León. Founded on 9 April 1945, it plays in Primera División RFEF – Group 2, holding home games at Nuevo Estadio Los Pajaritos.

Besides football it had other departments in sports, such as volleyball, women's handball, and rhythmic gymnastics.

History
The club was founded on 9 April 1945. Numancia was named after the ancient Celtiberian town of Numantia, near where Soria would be later founded. Having spent a long time in the Tercera División, the club made consistent progress, reaching the first division on three occasions: 1999, 2004 and 2008.

The club became first widely known in Spain in 1995–96, while still playing at the third level, for its extraordinary run in the Spanish Cup, eliminating three top flight clubs (Real Sociedad, Racing de Santander and Sporting de Gijón) and only being knocked out in the quarter-finals by Barcelona, after Numancia drew in the first leg and took the lead in the second.

Numancia's most important milestone came in 1999, when the team managed to promote to La Liga for the first time. In the 1998–99 season, Numancia finished third in Segunda, only behind Málaga CF and Atlético Madrid B, meaning the promotion to the top tier. Their first ever season in the Spanish elite proved to be challenging. Numancia eventually finished 17th, thus avoiding an immediate relegation to Segunda. Their survival was made possible because of unexpectedly good home results. Numancia won 9 home games, drew 6, and lost only 4 games at home. Their second season in the elite was less successful, as the team finished in last place. Numancia again displayed strong results at home, winning eight of their ten wins at home. However, that was eventually not enough to avoid a drop to Segunda, after a two-year spell in La Liga.

Numancia spent three seasons in Segunda Division, before promotion again after the 2003–04 season, as the club finished third. Numancia'second spell in the Spanish top tier was not successful as it only won 6 games. This meant that relegation followed just one season after.

Following another three years in Segunda, Numancia came back to La Liga for season 2008–09. Following a 1–3 loss at Sporting de Gijón on 2 November 2008, Numancia had conceded a total of 200 goals in the top division in slightly more than three seasons, reaching 44th in the all-time list. It battled bravely against relegation, but eventually returned to level two after just one year, as second from bottom, even though the season had started on a high note with a 1–0 home win against eventual champions Barcelona.

Numancia was relegated to third division followed at the end of the 2019-20 season after 23 years playing between first and second division. On next season, due to restructuring of the Spanish football league system, Numancia failed to survive in the third-tier and finding themselves dropped in the fourth-tier, in the newly formed Segunda División RFEF, for the 2021–22 season. On next season, Numancia achieved promoted back to newly third division, Primera División RFEF.

Honours
Segunda División: 2007–08
Tercera División: 1961–62, 1962–63, 1965–66, 1988–89
Promotion to La Liga: 1998–99, 2003–04, 2007–08

Season to season

4 seasons in La Liga
20 seasons in Segunda División
1 seasons in Primera División RFEF
9 seasons in Segunda División B
1 seasons in Segunda División RFEF
33 seasons in Tercera División
9 seasons in Categorías Regionales

Current squad
The numbers are established according to the official website: www.cdnumancia.com and www.lfp.es
.

Reserve team

Out on loan

Current technical staff

Former players
''

Coaches

 José Antonio Saro (1989–90)
 Jesús Tartilán (1991)
 Manuel García Calderón (1992–93)
 Miguel Ángel Lotina (1993–96)
 Paco Herrera (1998)
 Miguel Ángel Lotina (1998–99)
 Andoni Goikoetxea (1999–00)
 Paco Herrera (2000)
 Mariano García Remón (2000–01)
 Celestino Vallejo (2001)
 Luis Sánchez Duque (2001–02)
 Manuel Sarabia (2002)
 Máximo Hernández (2002–03)
 Quique Hernández (2003–04)
 Francisco (2004–05)
 Máximo Hernández (2004–05)
 Enrique Martín (2005)
 Andoni Goikoetxea (2005–07)
 Gonzalo Arconada (2007–08)
 Sergio Krešić (2008–09)
 Pacheta (2009)
 Gonzalo Arconada (2009–10)
 Juan Carlos Unzué (2010–11)
 Pablo Machín (2011–13)
 Juan Antonio Anquela (2013–15)
 Jagoba Arrasate (2015–2018)
 Aritz López Garai (2018–)

See also
CD Numancia B, reserve team.

References

External links

Official website 
Futbolme team profile 
BDFutbol team profile

 
Association football clubs established in 1945
Multi-sport clubs in Spain
1945 establishments in Spain
Football clubs in Castile and León
Sport in Soria
Segunda División clubs
La Liga clubs
Primera Federación clubs